Reginald "Reg" Edward Blakemore (1 September 1924  – 20 June 2006) was a Welsh rugby union, and professional rugby league footballer who played in the 1940s and 1950s.

Background
Reg Blakemore was born in Newport, Wales, and he died aged 81 in Parr, St. Helens, Lancashire, England.

Playing career

International honours
Reg Blakemore won a cap for Wales (RU) while at Newport RFC in 1947 against England.

Challenge Cup Final appearances
Reg Blakemore played  in St. Helens' 10-15 defeat by Huddersfield in the 1953 Challenge Cup Final during the 1952-53 season at Wembley Stadium, London on Saturday 25 April 1953.

County Cup Final appearances
Reg Blakemore played  in St. Helens' 5-22 defeat by Leigh in the 1952 Lancashire County Cup Final during the 1952–53 season at Station Road, Swinton on Saturday 29 November 1952, and in the 16-8 victory over Wigan in the 1953 Lancashire County Cup Final during the 1953–54 season at Station Road, Swinton on Saturday 24 October 1953.

Genealogical information
Reg Blakemore's marriage to Nancy (née Rigby) was registered during third ¼ 1951 in St. Helens district. They had children; Sandra Blakemore (birth registered third ¼  in Newport district).

References

External links
Search for "Blakemore" at rugbyleagueproject.org

Statistics at scrum.com
Statistics at wru.co.uk
Profile at saints.org.uk
Profile at blackandambers.co.uk

1924 births
2006 deaths
Newport RFC players
Rugby union players from Newport, Wales
Rugby league hookers
Rugby league players from Newport, Wales
Rugby union hookers
St Helens R.F.C. players
Wales international rugby union players
Welsh rugby league players
Welsh rugby union players